The McKay is a historic apartment building in Indianapolis, Indiana.  It was built in 1924, and is a three-story, trapezoidal shaped, Art Deco style brown cinder brick and concrete building on a raised basement. It has a one-story entrance foyer addition and Art Deco bas-relief carvings.

It was listed on the National Register of Historic Places in 1983.

References

Apartment buildings in Indiana
Residential buildings on the National Register of Historic Places in Indiana
Art Deco architecture in Indiana
Residential buildings completed in 1924
Residential buildings in Indianapolis
National Register of Historic Places in Indianapolis